Antonio Caio da Silva Souza, shortly Caio (born November 10, 1980) is a Brazilian footballer who plays as an offensive midfielder for Goiás.

His previous club was Al-Ahli in Saudi Arabia, Coritiba (PR), Flamengo (RJ), Chunnam Dragons in South Korea, Al-Khor, in Qatar, Paraná (PR), Ituano (SP), Rio Preto (SP), Rio Branco (SP), Bahia (BA), Avaí and Atlético Mineiro.

References

External links
 

1980 births
Living people
People from Nova Odessa
Brazilian footballers
Brazilian expatriate footballers
Association football midfielders
Avaí FC players
Rio Branco Esporte Clube players
Ituano FC players
Paraná Clube players
Jeonnam Dragons players
Al-Khor SC players
K League 1 players
Qatar Stars League players
CR Flamengo footballers
Coritiba Foot Ball Club players
Al-Ahli Saudi FC players
Brazilian expatriate sportspeople in South Korea
Brazilian expatriate sportspeople in Qatar
Esporte Clube Bahia players
Clube Atlético Mineiro players
Associação Atlética Ponte Preta players
Goiás Esporte Clube players
Campeonato Brasileiro Série A players
Expatriate footballers in Saudi Arabia
Expatriate footballers in South Korea
Expatriate footballers in Qatar
Saudi Professional League players
Footballers from São Paulo (state)